Radio Sargam is a nationwide commercial Hindi FM radio station in Fiji. It is owned by the Communications Fiji Limited (CFL), the company which owns FM96-Fiji, Viti FM, Legend FM and Radio Navtarang. Radio Sargam is broadcasting on three frequencies: 103.4 FM in Suva, Navua, Nausori, Labasa, Nadi and Lautoka; 103.2 FM in Savusavu, Coral Coast, Ba and Tavua; and on 103.8 FM in Rakiraki. Sargam can be accessed online for free.

The station went on air for the first time on March 31, 2004. The main competitors are Fiji Broadcasting Corporation-owned Radio Fiji Two and Mirchi FM. The first program director of the station was the late Anirudh Diwakar who designed the original program concept for the station. During Anirudh Diwakar's term as the program director, the station had the finest and most experienced Hindi radio presenters in Fiji. Today Radio Sargam is the largest Local Industry booster, and second most listened to "Hindi" radio station after its sister radio station Radio Navtarang.

Program schedule
Radio Sargam's lineup is as follows:
 Shubh Aagman 5–9 am: Angeleen Sharma & Jai Prasad
 Mahekta Aanchal 9 am – 2 pm: Sneh Chaudhry
 Manzil Manzil 2–7 pm:  Roneel Narayan
 Gulistaan 7 pm – 12 mid: Sonam
 Humraaz: 12 mid – 5 am

Announcers
 Angeleen Sharma
 Jai Prasad
 Sneh Chaudhry
 Roneel Narayan
 Sonam
 Ashneel
 Saagar
 Ranjina
 Reena
 Akansha
 Rashna 
 Arvind

Former radio jockeys
 Late Anirudh Diwakar
 Noor Jahan
 Vijay Varma
 Roma Maharaj
 Rohit Ritesh Sharma
 Jashmine Khan
 Roshni
 Deepshika
 Ashna Chand

References

Hindi-language radio stations
Radio stations in Fiji
Hindi Radio in Fiji